Vasilyevsky is a rural locality (a settlement) in Danilovskoye Rural Settlement, Melenkovsky District, Vladimir Oblast, Russia. The population was 1 as of 2010.

Geography 
Vasilyevsky is located 44 km west of Melenki (the district's administrative centre) by road. Dmitriyevo is the nearest rural locality.

References 

Rural localities in Melenkovsky District